Station Square is an interchange station on the Tbilisi Metro. It opened on 11 January 1966 and was one of the initial stations in the system. On 15 April 1979, the station began serving the Saburtalo Line. It was known as Vagzlis Moedani until 2011. Vagzlis comes from the Russian word for station, "Vokzal", since it is located below the Tbilisi railway station.

External links 

 Station Square page at Tbilisi Municipal Portal

Tbilisi Metro stations
Railway stations opened in 1966
Railway stations opened in 1979
1966 establishments in Georgia (country)
1979 establishments in Georgia (country)